Chandpura is a village located in Sikar district of Rajasthan. It is 3 km away from Sikar. SH 21 passes form Chandpura. The native language of Chandpura is Hindi and most of the village people speak Hindi. Chandpura people also use Marwari language for communication.

The vehicle driving side in Chandpura is left, all vehicles should take left side during driving. Chandpura people are using its national currency
 
which is Indian Rupee and its international currency code is INR.

Nearest airport to Chandpura - Jaipur

Nearest town/city to Chandpura - Sanwali

General information

 Main business: Agriculture.
 Religion: 100% of population are Hindus (Most population having cast Jat (MAWLIYA., Bajdoliya, Bijarniya, Sevda, Gora, Burdak))
 Geographical Location: 3 km from Sikar City.
 Temperature: Max. 44 °C in June, Min. 1 °C in January
 Monsoon Season: June to July
 Annual Rainfall: 419 mm

Agriculture

Education
Bhartiya Institute of Engineering And Technology Sikar
Government Polytechnic College Chandpura Sikar
EURO INTERLATIONAL SCHOOL CHANDPURA SIKAR
ADARSH BAL NIKETAN CHANDPURA

References

Villages in Sikar district